Adrián Lois Sixto (born 12 February 1989) is a Spanish footballer who plays for Atlético Saguntino as a midfielder.

Football career
Born in Valencia, Lois played youth football for local Levante UD, making his senior debuts with the reserves in the 2007–08 season, in Segunda División B. On 19 June 2010, with the main squad already promoted to La Liga, he made his official debut, coming on as a second-half substitute in a 0–4 away defeat against Real Betis in the Segunda División championship.

On 6 January 2011 Lois made his second appearance with the Granotas, in a 2–0 home win over Real Madrid for the campaign's Copa del Rey. His first game in the top flight occurred on 19 February, playing the last 11 minutes in a 0–2 away defeat to the same team.

In the 2012 summer Lois left Levante and signed with neighbouring CD Castellón, in Tercera División. On 19 February 2013 he was expected to join China League One club Hubei China-Kyle, but the deal fell through days later, and he signed a new two-year contract in July.

References

External links

1989 births
Living people
Footballers from Valencia (city)
Spanish footballers
Association football midfielders
La Liga players
Segunda División players
Segunda División B players
Tercera División players
Atlético Levante UD players
Levante UD footballers
CD Castellón footballers
Atlético Saguntino players